This list includes nationally or globally broadcast television shows shot either completely or partially in the Pittsburgh metropolitan area. Some of these are actually set in the city; others were shot in Pittsburgh but are set in another real or fictional location.

References
 Complete list of films shot in Pittsburgh
 Pittsburgh Film office projects
 Israeli filmmaker project

Lists of television series by setting

Television shows shot